The Arizona Rugby Union (ARU) is the Local Area Union (LAU) for rugby union teams in Arizona.  ARU is part of the Southern California Rugby Football Union (SCRFU), which is one of several Geographical Unions (GUs) that comprise USA Rugby.

Men's Clubs 

Division 2 (National Division 2):

 Tempe Old Devils

Division 3 (National Division 3):
 Camelback
 Northern Arizona Landsharks
 Old Pueblo Lions
 Phoenix RC
Red Mountain Warthogs
 Scottsdale Blues
 Tucson Magpies

Associate Members:
 Phoenix Storm
 Prescott Blacksheep
 Thunderbird
 Yuma Sidewinders

Women's Clubs 
Northern Arizona Lady Landsharks
Phoenix Womens Rugby Team
Scottsdale Lady Blues
Tempe Women's Rugby Club
Old Purblo Lightning

College Clubs 

Men:
Arizona State University Men Rugby
University of Arizona Wildcats
Grand Canyon University Men's Rugby

Women:

Women's Rugby at Arizona State University
University of AZ Women's Rugby
Grand Canyon University Women's Rugby

Under 19 Clubs 

High School:
Scottsdale Wolves
Tempe Rugby Club HS (U16, U19)
Ahwatukee Rugby Club
Arrowhead Berserkers
Brophy Rugby Club
Chandler United
North Valley Scorpions
East Valley Eagles RFC
Northern AZ Cobrafists
OP Lyons
Phoenix Firebirds HS
Red Mountain Knights
Salpointe Catholic Rugby Club
Tucson Barbarians
Tucson Blackbirds
West Valley Misfits
White Mountain Highlanders

Youth:
Scottsdale Wolves Youth
Eclipse Rugby
Chandler Crusaders
North Valley Scorpions
Phoenix Firebirds
Laveen Golden Eagles
Red Mountain Knights
Tempe Rugby Club Youth (U8-U14)
White Mountain Highlanders

Tournaments
The Arizona Rugby Fest  now hosted by the Arizona Rugby Union first started by the Scottsdale Blues in 1991 is a premier rugby 15's tournament that is held the first weekend in December each year when the weather is the most enjoyable in Arizona. The event attracts some of the most competitive sr. men's, sr. women's clubxfrom around the nation and offers an exceptionally impressive social program for the rugby fans.

References

External links
Official Site

Rugby union governing bodies in the United States
Rugby union in Arizona